The 10.5 cm howitzer Model 1924 was a howitzer used by the Netherlands during World War II. Fourteen were bought by the Royal Dutch East Indies Army, where they equipped the 1st Howitzer Artillery Battalion from 1924 to 1945. It is unknown if the Japanese used them after conquering the Dutch East Indies in 1942.

This weapon was designed for motor traction with rubber-rimmed steel wheels. Maximum towing speed was only 30 km/h (18.6 mph). It had a firing platform that gave it 360° traverse. On mount traverse was only 8° 30'.

References 

 Chamberlain, Peter & Gander, Terry. Light and Medium Field Artillery. New York: Arco, 1975

External links
 Artillery of the K.N.I.L. on Overvalwagens!

World War II field artillery
105 mm artillery